Yao Fen (born January 2, 1967) is a Chinese former international level women's badminton player.

Career
A doubles specialist, Yao won a number of top tier events on the world circuit in the early 1990s. Her earliest international success came in partnership with Lai Caiqin with whom she captured women's doubles' titles at the Japan and Thailand Opens and the Badminton World Cup in 1990. In her most successful season, 1992, she paired with Lin Yanfen to win the China and Swedish Opens, the Badminton World Cup, the World Badminton Grand Prix, and the prestigious All-England Championships. Yao and Lin were bronze medalists at the 1992 Olympic Games in Barcelona and played doubles for China's world champion 1992 Uber Cup (women's international) team. In 1993 they won the French Open women's doubles and were runners-up in defense of their title at the All England Championships.

External links
profile

1967 births
Living people
Chinese female badminton players
Badminton players at the 1992 Summer Olympics
Olympic badminton players of China
Olympic bronze medalists for China
Olympic medalists in badminton
Asian Games medalists in badminton
Badminton players from Hainan
Badminton players at the 1990 Asian Games
Medalists at the 1992 Summer Olympics
Asian Games gold medalists for China
Asian Games bronze medalists for China
Medalists at the 1990 Asian Games